The Ashland Place Historic District is a historic district in the city of Mobile, Alabama, United States. The neighborhood gained its name from a Greek Revival antebellum house called Ashland that once stood on Lanier Avenue. Ashland was famous as the home of Augusta Evans Wilson. The house burned in 1926. The Ashland Place Historic District was placed on the National Register of Historic Places on June 23, 1987. It is roughly bounded by Spring Hill Avenue, Ryan Avenue, Old Shell Road, and Levert Avenue. The majority of the buildings date to the early 20th century and cover a variety of historical architectural styles ranging from late Victorian to the Craftsman styles.

References

External links
Photo of Augusta Evans Wilson's home: Ashland

Historic districts in Mobile, Alabama
National Register of Historic Places in Mobile, Alabama
American Craftsman architecture in Alabama
Tudor Revival architecture in Alabama
Historic districts on the National Register of Historic Places in Alabama